Primula pauciflora, the pretty shooting star, few-flowered shooting star, dark throat shooting star or prairie shooting star, is a species of flowering plant in the primula family Primulaceae. It is a widespread and very variable species, native to western North America, from Subarctic America to Mexico, often in xeric (extremely dry) and desert habitats. It is found in the Great Basin Deserts and Mojave Desert. Its synonyms include Dodecatheon pauciflorum and Dodecatheon pulchellum.

Description
Primula pauciflora is a widespread and highly variable polyploid complex (2n = 44, 88 and 132). The inflorescence is made up of between 2 and fifteen flowers.

Primula pauciflora has been divided into up to seven varieties each with their own often complex set of synonyms. Primula pauciflora var. pauciflora, synonym Dodecatheon pulchellum, is a herbaceous perennial with single, leafless flower stems, growing from very short erect root stocks with no bulblets. Its leaves are basal, 2–15 cm long, blades oblong-lanceolate to oblanceolate, mostly entire to somewhat small-toothed, narrowed gradually to winged stalks nearly as long. Each plant has between 1 and 25 flowers clustered at the stem top. The calyx is usually purple-flecked, and the five lobes are 3 to 5 millimeters long. The corolla is 10 to 20 millimeters long, the 5 lobes swept backwards, purplish-lavender, seldom white, the short tube yellowish, usually with a purplish wavy line at the base. The filaments are joined into a yellowish tube 1.5–3 mm long, which is smooth or only slightly wrinkled. The 5 anthers are joined to a projecting point, usually yellowish to reddish-purple, 4–7 mm long. The stigma is slightly larger than the style. This plant flowers between April and August. The fruits are capsules, many-seeded, ovoid-cylindric, hairless to glandular-hairy, membranous to firm-walled, 5–15 mm long, opening from the tip into sharp teeth.

Varieties
, Plants of the World Online accepted seven varieties (distributions from the same source):
Primula pauciflora var. cusickii (Greene) A.R.Mast & Reveal – British Columbia, Idaho, Montana, Oregon, Washington State, Wyoming
Primula pauciflora var. distola (Reveal) A.R.Mast & Reveal – South Dakota, Wyoming
Primula pauciflora var. macrocarpa (A.Gray) A.R.Mast & Reveal – Alaska, British Columbia, California, Oregon, Washington State
Primula pauciflora var. monantha (Greene) A.R.Mast & Reveal – California, Oregon, Utah, Washington State
Primula pauciflora var. pauciflora – widespread from subarctic America to Mexico
Primula pauciflora var. shoshonensis (A.Nelson) A.R.Mast & Reveal – California, Idaho, Nevada, Oregon, Utah
Primula pauciflora var. zionensis (Eastw.) A.R.Mast & Reveal – Arizona, Colorado, Utah

Cultivation
Under the name Dodecatheon pulchellum, the plant has gained the Royal Horticultural Society’s Award of Garden Merit.

Native Americans
The pretty shooting star was used medicinally by the Okanagan-Colville and Blackfoot Indians. An infusion of the roots was used as a wash for sore eyes. A cooled infusion of leaves was used for eye drops. An infusion of leaves was gargled, especially by children, for cankers.

References

External links

USDA Plants Profile Dodecatheon pulchellum (Pretty shooting star)
Calflora Database: Dodecatheon pulchellum
Montana plant Life – Pretty shooting star (Dodecatheon pulchellum)
University of Washington : The Burke Museum Herbarium – Dodecatheon pulchellum (Pretty shooting star)

pauciflora
Flora of the Northwestern United States
Flora of the Southwestern United States
Flora of Western Canada
Flora of Alaska
Flora of Montana
Flora of Nebraska
Flora of New Mexico
Flora of North Dakota
Flora of the Northwest Territories
Flora of South Dakota
Flora of the California desert regions
Flora of the Great Basin
Natural history of the Mojave Desert
Plants used in Native American cuisine
Flora without expected TNC conservation status